Cosimo Zene is an Italian anthropologist and Professor in the Study of Religions and World Philosophies at SOAS, University of London. He is known for his works on anthropology of religion.

Books
Dialoghi Nulesi - Storia, Memoria, identita' di Nule (Sardegna) nell'antropologia di Andreas F. W. Bentzon, Nuoro, Italy: Edizioni ISRE (Istituto Superiore Regionale Etnografico) 2009
The Rishi of Bangladesh. A History of Christian Dialogues, London: Routledge Curzon 2002

References 

Living people
Anthropologists of religion
Italian anthropologists
Year of birth missing (living people)
Academics of SOAS University of London